Naisir Carmona (26 September 1998) is a footballer from Colombia who plays as a striker for Independiente Medellín.

References

1998 births
Living people
Colombian footballers
Association football forwards
Independiente Medellín footballers